Jarell Christian is an American basketball coach and former professional player. In October 2022, he was promoted to Director of Basketball Player Development with the Maine Celtics.

During the 2021-22 season, he was the head coach of the Maine Celtics in the NBA G League. He played college basketball at  Emory & Henry College.

Previously, he served as an assistant coach for the Oklahoma City Blue. He was hired by the Wizards in 2018 as head coach of their development team, the Capital City Go-Go, before being promoted to the Wizards' staff in 2019.

Christian is a former All-State track performer at New Kent High School, where he set state records in the 200M, 400M and 4x100 relay.  

Christian graduated from E&H in 2009 with a degree in Sports Management after playing four years of basketball for the Wasps.  During his senior year, he served as the high jump and sprint coach for the Patrick Henry High School track team. Christian helped guide that team to a District and Region Championship, coached seven All-State performers and two State Champions.

Born and raised in Quinton, Virginia he attended New Kent High School.  Christian's father, John, was a standout track athlete at Virginia State University.  His father, John Christian Jr., was a sprinter who was a member of the 1980 Olympic track team which boycotted the Olympics. The elder Christian is in the Virginia State University Hall of Fame and is a retired Head Coach of the Charles City County High School Track & Field team.  His mother was a teacher for New Kent Middle School (formerly New Kent High School). His brother Jamion Christian spent three years as the head coach of the Men’s Basketball team at George Washington University.

References
https://www.rmcathletics.com/sports/mbkb/2011-12/bios/christian-bio?view=bio

1986 births
Living people
American men's basketball coaches
American men's basketball players
Basketball coaches from Virginia
Basketball players from Virginia
Capital City Go-Go coaches
Emory and Henry Wasps men's basketball coaches
Emory and Henry Wasps men's basketball players
Oklahoma City Blue coaches
Oklahoma City Thunder assistant coaches
People from New Kent County, Virginia
Randolph–Macon Yellow Jackets men's basketball coaches
Tusculum Pioneers men's basketball coaches
Washington Wizards assistant coaches
Guards (basketball)